In the sport of basketball, there are five players that play per team, each assigned to positions. Historically, these players have been assigned to positions defined by the role they play on the court, from a strategic point of view. The three main positions are guard, forward, and center, with the standard team featuring two guards, two forwards, and a center. Over time, as more specialized roles developed, each of the guards and forwards came to be differentiated, and today each of the five positions are known by unique names, each of which has also been assigned a number: point guard (PG) or 1, the shooting guard (SG) or 2, the small forward (SF) or 3, the power forward (PF) or 4, and the center (C) or 5.

Guards
In the early days of the sport, there was a "running guard" who brought the ball up the court and passed or attacked the basket, like a point or combo guard. There was also a "stationary guard" who made long shots and hung back on defense effectively cherry-picking before there was the rule of backcourt violations.

Point guard

The point guard (PG), also known as the one, is typically the team's shortest player and best ball handler and passer. They usually are very fast and are good at driving and short-range. Therefore, they often lead their team in assists and are able to create shots for themselves and their teammates. They are quick and able to hit shots outside the key but a majority are inside the 3 point line or layups, largely depending on the player's skill level. Point guards are looked upon as the "floor general" or the "coach on the floor, and the heart of the team." They should study the game and game film to be able to recognize the weaknesses of the defense, and the strengths of their own offense. They are responsible for directing plays, making the position equivalent to that of quarterback in American football, playmaker in football, center in ice hockey, or setter in volleyball. Good point guards increase team efficiency and generally have a high number of assists. They are often referred to as dribblers or play-makers.

Point guards are required to do many things in the game of basketball that are very different from the other four positions on the court. While the other 4 positions are mainly focused on putting the ball in the hoop, the point guard must have a different, more team focused mentality. There are usually two types of point guards: a scoring point guard (also known as a lead guard) and a facilitator-type point guard. A scoring point guard regularly has the ability to shoot from three-point or mid-range distance. This type of point guard could also score around the basket with floaters, acrobatic layups or dunks. Damian Lillard and Stephen Curry are two examples of a scoring point guard. A facilitator-type point guard often has a high basketball IQ, or intuitive understanding of the game, and can see plays happening before they occur. In addition, these types of point guards are typically masters of the half court set offense, and they typically know the correct spots for each player on the court. Another name for this type of player could be ‘Coach on the Floor’. Chris Paul is an example of a facilitator-type point guard.

Shooting guard 

The shooting guard (SG)— also known as the two or the off guard— is, along with the small forward, often referred to as a wing because of its use in common positioning tactics. As the name suggests, most shooting guards are prolific from the three-point range and long mid-range. A key aspect of being a shooting guard is having the ability to patiently and methodically circulate the three-point line linearly with that of the ball. This allows the ability to correctly get into open space for other positions handling the ball. Just like all positions in basketball, the ability to communicate efficiently with teammates is key. If teammates do not know when/where a player will be open, they won't be able to deliver the ball when an opportunity presents itself.

Throughout the evolution of the game, there have been different types of shooting guards. Mainly categorized as offensive threats and defensive guards. If the shooting guard focuses more on taking perimeter jump shots, especially three-pointers, by the use of basketball screens such as down screens, and without much dribbling involved, then the shooting guard is typically known as a catch-and-shoot type of player. JJ Redick, would fit this type of play style. If the shooting guard emphasizes driving into the lane and scoring at (or around) the basket, then the shooting guard is generally referred to as a slasher type of player. Dwyane Wade was well known for his ability to slash into the lane and score around the rim. However, he also took his fair share of mid-range jump shots and three-pointers. These are known as offensive threats.

If the shooting guard’s main priority is to limit or prevent the opposing team’s star player (which is usually another shooting guard or other perimeter player), then the shooting guard could be known as a defensive specialist. Tony Allen, would be considered a defensive specialist. Shooting guards with the ability to shoot from the perimeter while limiting the scoring opportunities of the other team’s best perimeter player can be referred to as the 3-and-D type of players. Danny Green, is an example of a 3-and-D type of shooting guard. These are known as defensive guards.

Forwards

Small forward

The small forward (SF), also known as the three, is considered to be the most versatile of the main five basketball positions. Versatility is key for small forwards due to the nature of their role, which resembles that of a shooting guard more often than that of a small forward. This is why the small forward and shooting guard positions are often used interchangeably and referred to as wings.

Small forwards have a variety of assets, such as quickness and strength inside. A common thread among small forwards is an ability to "get to the line" and draw fouls by aggressively attempting (posting-up) plays, lay-ups, or slam dunks. As such, accurate foul shooting is also a common skill for small forwards, many of whom record a large portion of their points from the foul line. Besides being able to drive to the basket, they are also good shooters from long range. They are the second-best 3-point shooters on the court along with the shooting guard and usually when remaining stationary, they linger just inside the 3-point line. Some small forwards have good passing skills, allowing them to assume point guard responsibilities as point forwards. Small forwards should be able to do a little bit of everything on the court, typically playing roles such as swing men and defensive specialists. A small forward under 6 feet 5 inches (1.96 m) might play the shooting guard position some of the time while a small forward taller than 6 feet 7 inches (2.01 m) might play power forward some of the time. In the NBA, small forwards usually range from 6 feet 4 inches (1.92 m) to 6 feet 9 inches (2.04 m). Some of the greatest players to ever play at the small forward spot are LeBron James, Kevin Durant and Larry Bird. These 3 are usually regarded as the top 3 best players to ever play at the small forward spot.

Power forward

The power forward (PF), also known as the four, often plays a role similar to that of the center, down in the "post" or "low blocks". The power forward is often the team's most powerful and dependable scorer, being able to score close to the basket while also being able to shoot mid-range jump shots from 10 – 15 feet from the basket. Power forwards are also very crafty and have to be versatile on both offense and defense but not as much as a small forward. Some power forwards have become known as stretch fours, since extending their shooting range to three-pointers. On defense, they are required to have the strength to guard bigger players close to the basket and to have the athleticism to guard quick players away from the basket. Most power forwards tend to be more versatile than centers since they can be part of plays and are not always in the low block.

The power forward is essentially a bigger and stronger version of the small forward but not generally as tall or as long as the center. Generally speaking, the power forward is usually good at rebounding and in some instances, a power forward with a high basketball IQ could also be a great passer, particularly from the high or low post areas via post split action. Giannis Antetokounmpo or Dirk Nowitzki is a notable example of a power forward. Instead of a physical power forward, the stretch four is known primarily for shooting three pointers and midrange jumpshots instead of post play. The stretch four could also be very useful as a pick and pop screener, especially against the drop coverage defensive technique. For example, if the stretch four pops to the perimeter after setting a screen, then their defender will most likely not have enough time to closeout and contest the potential open jump shot if the defender executes drop coverage.

Center 

The center (C)—also known as the five, the pivot or the big man—usually plays near the baseline or close to the basket (the "low post"). They are usually the tallest players on the floor. Centers usually score "down low", or "in the paint" (near the basket, in the key), but there have been many centers who are good perimeter shooters as well. They're typically skilled at pulling down rebounds, contesting shots and setting screens on players.

The range of players used in the position has transitioned from relatively slower but much taller "back to the basket" players to players who could also be classified as power forwards but who can dominate opponents with their defensive skills, or mismatch ability to shoot from the high post. This has been due to the scarcity of players possessing the combination of great skill, ideal height, and durability. The development of more fast-paced and athletic basketball play, which calls for less traditional center play and a more up-and-down-the-court play style has also contributed to the shift over time.

The presence of a center who can score in the low post (the area closest to the basket) helps create balance within an offense. If it becomes too easy to score from the low post, the center will get double teamed. This creates opportunity for open shots for perimeter players as the center will “kick it out” to an open perimeter or “wing” player. As perimeter players shoot better from long range, this may create easier opportunities for a center to score, since defenses often play out closer to the perimeter shooters.

See also 
Starting lineup

References

External links 
"Basketball players" at BBC Sport Academy